Mootral is a British-Swiss company that is developing a food supplement to reduce methane emissions from ruminant animals, chiefly cows and sheep, but also goats. Methane is a major target greenhouse gas and in the 4th protocol report of the Intergovernmental Panel on Climate Change (IPCC) is recommended to increase from a x23 to x72 multiplier because of the magnitude of its effect relative to carbon dioxide and short longevity in Earth's atmosphere.

Natural feed supplement 

The Mootral natural feed supplement is produced by Neem Biotech. The active ingredient is an organic organosulfur compound (normally found in garlic), Research at the University of Aberystwyth, Wales has demonstrated up to a 94% reduction in methane production.

Emission trading
Companies using Mootral's feed supplement generate carbon credits that may be used to offset their emissions levels or sold to third parties. In December 2019, Verra announced that it had approved Mootral as the world's first methodology to reduce methane emissions from ruminant livestock.

Publicity
Mootral attracted much attention as runner-up in the FT Global Climate Challenge and Dutch Postcode Lottery.  

Mootral was a finalist in the Shell/BBC/Newsweek World Challenge 2009 as one of the 12 most promising solutions to climate change.

Mootral is privately funded by Chris Sacca and Tribe Capital.

References

Sources 
http://www.incropsproject.co.uk/documents/Events/Launch2009/David%20Wiliams%20Neem%20Biotech.pdf
2009 Finalist EMISSION CONTROL; UNITED KINGDOM
 Animal Feed Science and Technology, Volume 147, Issues 1-3, 14 November 2008, Pages 36-52 
 Animal Feed Science and Technology, Volume 145, Issues 1-4, 14 August 2008, Pages 351-363 
 J. Dairy Sci. 89:761-771, 2006

Climate change and agriculture
Emissions reduction
Methane